MN1, MN 1, or MN-1 may be:

 Minnesota State Highway 1
 Ulaanbaatar, ISO 3166-2 geocode for the capital of Mongolia
 Minnesota's 1st congressional district
 The MN1 gene on human chromosome 22
 MN 1 (biostratigraphic zone), a biostratigraphic zone in the European Neogene